The Math Science Teaching Corps Act of 2006 (or MSTC, pronounced "mystic") is legislation based on nonprofit Math for America's (MƒA's) Programs, the MƒA Fellowship and the MƒA Master Teacher Program. The bill was introduced in the 109th Congress by Charles Schumer in the Senate as S. 2248 and by Jim Saxton in the House as H.R. 4705. The MSTC legislation creates a National Science Foundation Fellowship Program to recruit, train, and retain outstanding math and science teachers. MƒA is engaged in an advocacy campaign to move forward federal legislation based on MSTC principles.

External links
S. 2248 from the Library of Congress
H.R. 4705 from Library of Congress
The Math for America website

United States federal education legislation